Tom Boyd (April 1903 – 6 December 1991) was a shipyard worker, patternmaker, trade unionist and  politician in Northern Ireland.

After studying at Belfast Technical College and Queen's University, Belfast, Boyd became prominent in the United Patternmakers' Association. Joining the Northern Ireland Labour Party (NILP), he stood for election to the Belfast Board of Guardians in 1933.

In the 1938 Stormont elections, Boyd stood unsuccessfully in Belfast Victoria.  In the 1945 UK general election, he stood for the Westminster seat of Belfast East, taking 43.6% of the vote.  He stood for the seat again in 1950, 1951 and 1955, but never came so close to election.

In the 1949 Stormont election, Boyd stood in Belfast Bloomfield, and in 1953, he stood in Belfast Pottinger.  He finally won this seat in 1958, and on election he became the leader of the NILP, a post he held until finally losing his seat at the 1969 election.

Following his defeat, Boyd led the Presbyterian Church of Ireland Social Services Committee until 1978.

References
Northern Ireland Parliamentary Elections Results: Biographies

1903 births
1991 deaths
Leaders of political parties in Northern Ireland
Members of the House of Commons of Northern Ireland 1958–1962
Members of the House of Commons of Northern Ireland 1962–1965
Members of the House of Commons of Northern Ireland 1965–1969
Northern Ireland Labour Party members of the House of Commons of Northern Ireland
Patternmakers (industrial)
British trade union leaders
Presbyterians from Northern Ireland
Members of the House of Commons of Northern Ireland for Belfast constituencies